Mostaza, SA is an Argentine fast food chain that was established in 1998. Its specialities are hamburgers, sandwiches, desserts and café. It is the second largest fast food chain in its country, after the multinational McDonald's.

 Mostaza had 50 restaurants around the country, being present in hypermarkets, malls and on the street. As of 2018, it doubled that amount to 110 stores.

See also
 List of hamburger restaurants

Further reading

References

External links

 

Fast-food franchises
Fast-food hamburger restaurants
Restaurants in Argentina
Argentine brands
Fast-food chains of Argentina